"Jack's Heroes" is a single released by The Pogues & The Dubliners in 1990, composed by tin whistle player Spider Stacy about the Republic of Ireland football squad, then managed by Jack Charlton. The song is to the tune of "The Wild Colonial Boy", a traditional Irish-Australian ballad. The video featured the two bands playing against each other in a football match. The single charted in Ireland at Number 4 and in the UK Top 100 at Number 63.

The b-side on the 7 inch single was the traditional song "Whiskey in the Jar", again featuring both bands. 12 inch, CD and DAT releases also included an extended mix of "Whiskey in the Jar".

Charts

References

1990 singles
1990 songs
Republic of Ireland national football team songs
Republic of Ireland at the 1990 FIFA World Cup
The Dubliners songs
The Pogues songs